Lionel d'Aragon (5 July 1863 - 1941) was a British actor of the silent era. He was born in Paris, France and died in Camberwell, London.

Selected filmography
 Heroes of the Mine (1913)
 A Fair Impostor (1916)
 The Valley of Fear (1916)
 It Is for England (1916)
 Little Women (1917)
 Drink (1917)
 The Sorrows of Satan (1917)
 The Key of the World (1918)
 The Great Impostor (1918)
 Pallard the Punter (1919)
 Love's Boomerang (1922)
 A Lost Leader (1922)
 The Spanish Jade (1922)
 Guy Fawkes (1923)
 Lily of the Alley (1923)
 Curfew Must Not Ring Tonight (1923)
 The Virgin Queen (1923)
 The Loves of Mary, Queen of Scots (1923)
 The Fair Maid of Perth (1923)
 Mist in the Valley (1923)
 The Flying Fifty-Five (1924)
 Adventurous Youth (1928)

References

External links

1863 births
1941 deaths
British male film actors
British male silent film actors
20th-century British male actors
French emigrants to the United Kingdom